Rose Marie MacDonald, née MacLean (July 3, 1941 – September 3, 2012) was a Canadian politician, who represented 5th Kings in the Legislative Assembly of Prince Edward Island from 1988 to 1996. She was a member of the Prince Edward Island Liberal Party.

Born in Woodville Mills, Prince Edward Island, she worked as a cook, as an office clerk and as an employee of the Bank of Montreal prior to her career in politics.

She was first elected to the legislature in a by-election in 1988, and was reelected in the general elections of 1989 and 1993. As a member of the assembly, she chaired the committee on education, community and cultural affairs, the committee on natural resources and the environment and a special committee on legislative reform, and served as the Liberal caucus whip. On April 20, 1995, she was speaking in the legislature when a pipe bomb exploded outside the building, sending glass flying into the chamber.

At the 1996 regional conference of the Commonwealth Parliamentary Association, MacDonald was a panelist, alongside Lloyd Snow of Newfoundland and Maynard Sonntag of Saskatchewan, at a seminar on the social and legal implications of government-sponsored gambling initiatives.

In the 1996 election, she was defeated by Michael Currie of the Progressive Conservatives in the new district of Georgetown-Baldwin's Road.

She later served on the board of directors of the Souris Hospital, the Island Community Theatre and the Canada Mortgage and Housing Corporation.

References

1941 births
2012 deaths
Women MLAs in Prince Edward Island
People from Kings County, Prince Edward Island
Prince Edward Island Liberal Party MLAs